Miralem is a Bosnian masculine given name. People with the name include:
 Miralem Halilović, Bosnian basketball player
 Miralem Fazlić, Bosnian footballer
 Miralem Ibrahimović, Bosnian footballer
 Miralem Pjanić, Bosnian footballer
 Miralem Sulejmani, Serbian footballer

Bosnian masculine given names